Arshad Ali Khan is an Indian classical singer belonging to the Kirana gharana (singing style).

Early life and education
He descends from the family lineage of Abdul Wahid Khan and Abdul Karim Khan, the founders of Kirana Gharana. He got education in music from his maternal uncles Mashkoor Ali Khan and Mubarak Ali Khan.

At the age of 9, he was described as the biggest sensation of Sawai Gandharva Samelan, following his performance on a special invitation by Bhimsen Joshi on the occasion of his 75th birthday.

Career
Khan has performed in numerous music festivals around the world, including Sawai Gandharva Bhimsen Festival in Pune Harballabh Sangeet Sammelan in Jalandhar, Saptak Music Festival, Karavalli Festival, Mangalore, Sangeet Natak Akademi's ‘Sangit Pratibha’ in Patna, Gharana Sammelan in Mumbai, Bhatkhande Sangeet Sammelan, Doverlane music festival in Kolkata, Classical Music Festival organised by Parveen Begum Smruti Music and Educational Trust in Bangalore, Legends of India Baithak in Delhi.

Arshad Ali uses the merukhand vistar or development. He is a musician teacher at ITC Sangeet Research Academy, Kolkata.

He is an empanelled artist in ICCr and his international tours taking him all over USA, Canada, Europe and the Middle East and Singapore have been outstanding successes. He has performed at the Theatre de la Ville in Paris, the Trophen Theatre in Amsterdam, the Indo-Persian Festival of Music at Marseille, the Mawazine Festival in Morocco, Raag Mala in California, Bengal Foundation Music Conference in Bangladesh, and many more.

Awards and recognitions
Arshad Ali Khan was awarded Bismillah Khan Yuva Puraskar 2013 by Sangeet Natak Akademi. He is the recipient of several other awards including JADUBHATTA PURASHKAR, Bharatiya Sansad Best Vocalist Award, ‘Best Young Talent of the Year’ by Rasa and Melting Pot Productions, SUR JYOTSNA NATIONAL AWARD FOR BEST MALE VOCALIST BY LOKMAT MAHARASHTRA and VIDYA SAGAR AWARD FROM N.C.P.A MUMBAI.

CD releases

References

21st-century Indian male classical singers
Kirana gharana
Living people
1984 births